Events of the year 1939 in Belgium.

Incumbents
Monarch: Leopold III
Prime Minister: Paul-Henri Spaak (to 22 February); Hubert Pierlot (from 22 February)

Events

 9 February – Paul-Henri Spaak's coalition government falls apart
 22 February – Hubert Pierlot forms Catholic–Socialist coalition
 2 April – 1939 Belgian general election
 18 April – Hubert Pierlot forms Catholic–Liberal coalition
 25 June – Hermann Lang wins the 1939 Belgian Grand Prix at Spa-Francorchamps
 30 July – Exposition internationale de l'eau opens in Liège
 25 August – Belgian Armed Forces begin mobilisation
 3 September – Hubert Pierlot forms government of national unity

Publications
 Hergé, Le Sceptre d'Ottokar (serialised in Le Petit Vingtième from 4 August 1938 to 10 August 1939) published as an album
 Georges Simenon, Le Bourgmestre de Furnes
 Gerard Walschap, Houtekiet

Art and architecture

Buildings
 Queen Elisabeth Music Chapel on the Argenteuil Estate in Waterloo

Paintings
 René Magritte, The Palace of Memories

Births
 21 February – May Claerhout, artist (died 2016)
 9 March – Jos Van Gorp, actor (died 2021)
 12 April – Philippe Moureaux, politician (died 2018)
 9 June – Johan Weyts, politician (died 2021)
 3 July – Willy Vanden Berghen, road bicycle racer

Deaths
 6 January – Georges Ista (born 1874), writer
 15 February – Henri Jaspar (born 1870), politician
 6 March – Michel Levie (born 1851), politician
 14 March – Marie Haps (born 1879), philanthropist
 25 June – Richard Seaman (born 1913), racing driver, dies after crashing in the 1939 Belgian Grand Prix
 6 November – Adolphe Max (born 1869), politician
 23 November – Gaston-Antoine Rasneur (born 1874), bishop

References

 
1930s in Belgium
Belgium
Years of the 20th century in Belgium
Belgium